Martin or Marty Robinson may refer to:

Martin Robinson (footballer) (born 1957), English footballer 
Martin P. Robinson (born 1954), puppeteer for the Jim Henson Company
Martin Robinson (tennis) (born 1955), British tennis player
Marty Robinson (announcer) (born 1932), staff announcer at Channel 11, Chicago, US
Martin Robinson (cricketer) (born 1962), English cricketer
Marty Robinson (gay activist) (1942–1992), American gay activist
Martin David Robinson, the birth name of Marty Robbins, (1925–1982), American musician and NASCAR driver